Integral Autonomy may refer to:

 Integral Autonomy (1980s), regionalist Italian political party  (Autonomia Integrale, 1982–1988)
 Integral Autonomy (1990s), regionalist Italian political party  (Autonomia Integrale–FAR, 1996–2000)